Sporting Kansas City II is a MLS Next Pro club affiliated with Sporting Kansas City of Major League Soccer. For the 2022 season they will play their home games at Rock Chalk Park at the University of Kansas in Lawrence, Kansas, as well as Swope Soccer Village in Kansas City, Missouri. They were formerly known as the Swope Park Rangers. The club is headquartered alongside Sporting Kansas City at Children's Mercy Park in Kansas City, Kansas.

History
On October 22, 2015, the team was officially announced as the USL's 30th franchise, as were the Swope Park Rangers name, color scheme and logo. The Rangers replaced Oklahoma City Energy FC as SKC's USL affiliate, and was named after a nickname for SKC reserve squad in 2008. The team is Sporting Kansas City's third USL affiliate in the team's history, after previously having partnered with Orlando City SC and Oklahoma City Energy FC. Canadian Marc Dos Santos, who led Ottawa Fury FC to the NASL Soccer Bowl in 2015, was named the first head coach of the Rangers on November 20, 2015.

The Rangers finished their inaugural season in 2016 with a 14–10–6 record and finished fourth in the Western Conference. The side advanced to the 2016 USL Cup Final, becoming just the second team in USL history to do so in its inaugural season. The Rangers beat LA Galaxy II, Orange County SC and Vancouver Whitecaps FC 2 en route to the final where the side eventually fell 5–1 to New York Red Bulls II at Red Bull Arena. Goalkeeper Adrian Zendejas and winger Tyler Pasher were each signed by parent club Sporting Kansas City at the end of the season.

Following the conclusion of the 2016 season, Marc Dos Santos departed to take over at newly founded NASL club the San Francisco Deltas. His assistant for the 2016 campaign, Nikola Popovic, took the reins ahead of the 2017 season. The side continued to have success as Popovic led the team to a 17–8–7 record in the West and another fourth-place finish. Sporting KC also signed four more players from SPR during 2017 in Amer Didic, James Musa, Kharlton Belmar and Kevin Oliveira. Popovic resigned as head coach on November 17, 2017, after leading Swope Park to their second consecutive conference championship.

On September 30, 2019, the club announced that it would re-brand as Sporting Kansas City II ahead of the 2020 USL Championship season.

MLS Next Pro
The club announced on December 6, 2021, that it was joining the inaugural 21-team MLS Next Pro season starting in 2022. Former Sporting Kansas City player Benny Feilhaber was named the team's head coach for the 2022 season.

Location
The team is headquartered out of Children's Mercy Park in Kansas City, Kansas. For the 2022 season they will split matches between Rock Chalk Park at the University of Kansas in Lawrence, Kansas, as well as return to Swope Soccer Village in Kansas City, Missouri.

When the team was known as Swope Park Rangers they played at Swope Soccer Village in Kansas City, Missouri as permanent home venue for the 2016 and 2017 USL seasons, although occasional matches were played at Children's Mercy Park during those first two seasons. For the 2018 season, the Rangers moved to Shawnee Mission District Stadium in Overland Park, Kansas for home USL matches. The move to Shawnee Mission South District Stadium was in response to new USL stadium standards, requiring seating for at least 5,000 fans, that were not met by Swope Soccer Village. The 7,500-seat Shawnee Mission South District Stadium had received $6 million in improvements between fall 2016 and spring 2017. After just two home matches into the season, the Rangers announced that all home matches would be moved to Children's Mercy Park for the remainder of the 2018 USL season. The move came just days after allegations were reported that there had been issues with the quality of the artificial-turf field at Shawnee Mission South.

Players and staff

Roster

Technical staff 
  Benny Feilhaber - head coach
  Ike Opara – assistant coach
  Wan Kuzac Wan Kamal — assistant team administrator

Year-by-year 

1. Top Scorer includes statistics from league matches only.

1. Top Scorer includes statistics from league matches only.

Head coaches
 Includes USL regular season, USL playoffs

Average attendance

Honors
 USL Cup 
Runners-up (2): 2016, 2017
Western Conference
Winners (Playoffs): 2016, 2017

References

External links

 
 Sporting Kansas City II at USL Championship

 
Association football clubs established in 2015
Soccer clubs in Kansas City, Missouri
Former USL Championship teams
Sporting Kansas City
2015 establishments in Missouri
Reserve soccer teams in the United States
Sports teams in the Kansas City metropolitan area
MLS Next Pro teams